Beta-defensin 3 is a protein that in humans is encoded by the DEFB3 gene.

HBD-3 was first isolated from human lesional psoriatic scales. RT-PCR showed HBD-3 to be expressed highly in skin, trachea, tongue and tonsils, with lower levels found salivary glands, uterus, kidney, bone marrow, thymus, colon, stomach, adenoid, pharynx, and larynx.

References 

Peripheral membrane proteins
Defensins